Thennankudy is a revenue village in the Thirunallar taluk of Karaikal District. It is situated to the west of Thirunallar.

References 

 

Villages in Karaikal district